Hoploranomimus harmandi is a species of beetle in the family Cerambycidae, and the only species in the genus Hoploranomimus. It was described by Pic in 1939.

References

Acanthocinini
Beetles described in 1939
Monotypic beetle genera